Gem Accounts is a range of cloud-based business and accounting software, first released in May 2013 by Gem Software Solutions Pty Ltd from Brisbane, Australia. The software is available in a free version and is also sold on a SaaS model which includes a try-before-you-buy period.

Gem Accounts claims its software offers several first in its space. Gems data export and backup facilities are one of the first cloud-based products - allowing the user to do a full export of their data set in several open formats. Gem's multi-language configuration options are also seen as a first in this sort of software. Gem Accounts is also the first cloud accounting company to join the "Free Our Data" initiative.

History
December 2013	- document storage included in all plans
December 2013	- free version launched
November 2013	- smb version launched
November 2013	- major upgrade to version 2 released
October 2013	- major share of company acquired by simPRO Software
May 2013	- full release
January 2013	- beta release

Program versions
Gem Accounts is available in three different versions. All versions contain the full feature set however are limited by transaction volume. Key Features include: General Ledger, Accounts Receivable, Accounts Payable, Double-entry System, Multi-user, Multi-currency, Multi-language, Inventory Control, Service and Project Tracking & Billing, Payroll, Data and Backup Exports.

Free version - released in December 2013 - is designed for the micro and small business market. All the features of the main product but with a limit of 150 transactions and does not include access to the API, multi-company and consolidated reporting.

SME version - released in November 2013 - is designed for the SME market and contains all the MME features but has a 1500 transaction limit.

MME version - released in May 2013 is the full-featured product with no transaction or other limitations.

See also
Comparison of accounting software

References

External links
Company website

Accounting software